Harry Markland Molson (August 9, 1856 – April 15, 1912) was a Canadian politician and entrepreneur. A member of the Molson family, he was Mayor of Dorval, Quebec. He perished in the sinking of RMS Titanic on April 15, 1912.

Molson was born August 9, 1856, son of William Markland Molson (1833–1913) and Helen Augusta Converse (1834–1919), in Montreal, Quebec, Canada. Although Harry Molson was not a prominent member of the influential branch of the Molson family, he serendipitously inherited his fortune from his childless uncle, John Henry Robinson Molson (1826–1897), who was former owner of Molson Brewery and President of Molson Bank (1889–1897).

Harry Molson went to England for business in February 1912, and had booked passage to return to Canada at the end of March on the Allan Line ocean liner, SS Tunisian. Molson was persuaded by fellow businessman, Major Arthur Peuchen, to extend his stay in England and sail home with him on Titanic'''s maiden voyage. He occupied First Class stateroom C-30.

He was Governor of Montreal General Hospital, and on the board of directors for the Molson Bank.

Molson was last seen aboard Titanic'', removing his shoes and planning to swim to a ship's light he claimed he saw off the port bow. His body was never recovered.

See also
RMS Titanic

References

1856 births
1912 deaths
Mayors of places in Quebec
Harry Markland Molson
People from Dorval
Deaths on the RMS Titanic
19th-century American businesspeople